The men's double sculls rowing event at the 2013 Mediterranean Games were held from June 21–23 at the Seyhan Dam in Adana.

Schedule
All times are Eastern European Summer Time (UTC+3).

Results

Heat 1

References

Rowing at the 2013 Mediterranean Games